Daei Sportswear & Equipment is a major Iranian manufacturer of apparel and sports equipment. It is owned and was founded by Iranian football player Ali Daei. The company provides football kits for Iran's Premier Football League teams. Its headquarters are located in Tehran, Iran. Daei Sport was the official kit provider for the Iran national football team in 2009.

Sponsorships

Club teams

Persian Gulf Pro League
  Saba Qom (2013–14 & 2015–2017)
  Naft Tehran (2013–2014)
  Rah Ahan (2011–2013)
  Damash Gilan (2012)

National teams
  (2004–2006 & 2008–2009)

External links
 

Clothing companies of Iran
Clothing companies established in 2009
Sportswear brands
Sporting goods manufacturers of Iran
Manufacturing companies based in Tehran
Iranian brands